State Highway 186 (SH 186) is a state highway located in the Rio Grande Valley of the U.S. state of Texas. The route connects US 281 (Future I-69C) to the Gulf of Mexico at Port Mansfield.

Route description
SH 186 begins in the Hidalgo County community of Linn at an intersection with  US 281 (Future I-69C); the roadway to the west of this junction is designated  FM 1017. The route travels to the southeast, passing a section of the Lower Rio Grande Valley National Wildlife Refuge, before turning to a more easterly path and crossing into Willacy County. SH 186 runs along Hidalgo Avenue in Raymondville, where it crosses  I-69E / US 77. Continuing to the east, the highway passes to the south of the city of San Perlita before turning to the northeast and passing through an unincorporated section of the county. In Port Mansfield, SH 186 intersects the short  FM 606 near its eastern terminus; the highway continues one block past this point before ending at Laguna Madre.

History
SH 186 was designated on December 8, 1932 along a route from Linn to Raymondville. On July 15, 1935, the west end was shortened to the Willacy County Line. On August 1, 1936, this section was restored. On July 25, 1939, it extended east to San Perlita. On May 31, 1973, the portion of SH 186 from San Perlita southward was transferred to  FM 2209. SH 186 was signed, but not designated, along FM 497 instead. SH 186 was extended to its current eastern terminus in Port Mansfield on August 29, 1990, replacing FM 497.

Major intersections

References

186
Transportation in Hidalgo County, Texas
Transportation in Willacy County, Texas